The 2012 FIM Fogo European Speedway Grand Prix was the second race of the 2012 Speedway Grand Prix season. It took place on 28 April at the Alfred Smoczyk Stadium in Leszno, Poland.

The last SGP in Leszno was won by Chris Holder who beat Tomasz Gollob, Jarosław Hampel and Andreas Jonsson in the final.

Riders 

The Speedway Grand Prix Commission nominated Przemysław Pawlicki as Wild Card, and Tobiasz Musielak and Piotr Pawlicki, Jr. both as Track Reserves. The Draw was made on 27 April.

Heat details

Heat after heat 
 (62.40) Hancock, Sayfutdinov, Jonsson, Ljung
 (62.54) Hampel, N.Pedersen, Gollob, Andersen
 (61.99) Prz.Pawlicki, Lindgren, Lindbäck, B.Pedersen
 (62.11) Bjerre, Crump, Harris, Holder
 (62.85) Ljung, Andersen, Lindgren, Harris (R4)
 (61.50) Holder, Hancock, Hampel, Lindbäck
 (61.63) Prz.Pawlicki, Sayfutdinov, Bjerre, N.Pedersen
 (61.44) Jonsson, Crump, B.Pedersen, Gollob
 (62.50) Crump, Hampel, Prz.Pawlicki, Ljung
 (61.84) Bjerre, Hancock, B.Pedersen, Andersen
 (62.10) Gollob, Holder, Sayfutdinov, Lindgren (F3)
 (60.84) Jonsson, N.Pedersen, Lindbäck, Harris (R4)
 (62.95) N.Pedersen, Holder, Ljung, B.Pedersen
 (62.60) Gollob, Hancock, Harris, Prz.Pawlicki
 (62.27) Crump, Lindbäck, Andersen, Sayfutdinov
 (61.66) Jonsson, Lindgren, Hampel, Bjerre
 (62.71) Gollob, Ljung, Bjerre, Lindbäck (R4)
 (62.25) Lindgren, N.Pedersen, Crump, Hancock
 (61.66) Hampel, Sayfutdinov, Harris, B.Pedersen (F4)
 (63.10) Holder, Andersen, Jonsson, Prz.Pawlicki
 Semi-finals:
 (61.99) Holder, Jonsson, N.Pedersen, Hancock (R3)
 (61.41) Hampel, Gollob, Crump, Bjerre
 the Final:
 (62.43) Holder (6 points), Gollob (4), Hampel (2), Jonsson (0)

The intermediate classification

References

See also 
 motorcycle speedway

Speedway Grand Prix of Europe
Europe
2012
Sport in Greater Poland Voivodeship
Leszno